Chittagong Independent University (CIU) started its journey in Chittagong in 1999 as an additional campus of Independent University Bangladesh (IUB). IUB and the founding trust pioneered the establishment of private universities in Bangladesh. CIU was formed by the same trust ESTCDT after the amendment by the private university Act. which required that the Chittagong Campus be registered as a separate university. Accordingly, CIU was founded on 6 February 2013 in succession.

Admission

The applicants have to pass the competitive admission test administered by the university. The admission examination tests each student's potential to successfully pursue the undergraduate or graduate degree programs.

Semesters

The academic year of the university incorporates two regular semesters (spring and autumn) and one short semester (summer). The duration of each semesters are:
 Spring Semester: January–April
 Summer Semester: May–August
 Autumn Semester: September–December

List of vice-chancellors 
 Prof. Mahfuzul Hoque Chowdhury ( present )

Academics

The medium of instruction of all academic programs at CIU is English. Classes are conducted by full participation of students (discussion, question-answer, projects). Study in the UK from CIU MOI.(i-Global Services, Call:+8801409956101-10)

Programs
The schools offer both undergraduate and master's degrees. The academic programs gradually develop around the Faculty of Business Administration, Faculty of Engineering and Computer Science and Faculty of Liberal Arts & Social Science.

Facilities

Library

The library of CIU is the collection of the knowledge and built up a collection in Business Administration, Science and Technology, Computer, Arts and Social Science. It is an open library system to students of CIU, which provides rich collection of books including journals, newsletter, thesis works, audio-visual materials and CDs. The library has online access to Emerald, Jstor, Oxford University Press Journal and Hinari. CIU has a fully functional digital library which has more than 10,000 documents. These documents include not only books and articles on science and engineering, but also on ranging topics like language, philosophy, history, social science, etc. It also stores over 3,000 theses and dissertations of universities from all over the world. The system is accessible through the internet. All books and journals titles can be accessed through CIU library online databases.

The American Corner

The campus has an American Corner for information on US. The American Corner provides basic reference materials on the United States, Internet terminals, video viewing facilities, and English-language tapes, as well as a growing section of guidebooks for students wanting to study at American universities. Chittagong's Corner established at the Chittagong Independent University, was the first in South Asia.

Lab facilities

CIU has physics lab, circuits lab, microprocessor and interfacing lab, digital signal processing lab, telecommunication lab, network lab, and machines lab. Among the equipments used for conducting laboratory classes in these labs include antenna and wave propagation trainer, spectrum analyzer, digital storage oscilloscope, digital and analogue communication trainer, fiber optics trainer, control system trainer, electrical machines training system, digital signal processing trainer, microprocessor trainer, industrial electronics training system, data communication and networking training system, mobile communication trainer. Besides these laboratories, CIU also has three fully equipped computer laboratories.;

Internship / senior project

All students are required to take part in an industrial internship or senior project as part of their four-year program. The internship experience gives them a hands-on experience of working in an industrial environment; while the senior projects give them an exposure to conduct guided research work.

Clubs
 Independent University Cultural Club
 Independent University Alumni Association
 Independent Science & Engineering Club
 Andragogy Practicum Club
 Business Students’ Society
 Environment Club
 Film Club
 Independent Marketing Club
 Intrinsic Finance Club
 HRM Society
 SLASS Debating Society
 Creative Writers' Club

References

External links
 
 

Universities and colleges in Chittagong
Educational institutions established in 2013
2013 establishments in Bangladesh
Private universities in Bangladesh